WMQM is an American Christian radio station in Lakeland, Tennessee (Memphis broadcast market), broadcasting with 50,000 watts day and 35 watts night on 1600 AM. WMQM is a sister station to shortwave radio station WWCR. WMQM is owned and operated by F. W. Robbert Broadcasting, Inc.

History
In 1955, WKBJ AM 1600 signed on in Milan, Tennessee, operated by Milan Broadcasting Company, Inc.
On December 3, 2001, WKBJ applied to relocate to Lakeland, Tennessee.  The application was granted when KJIW AM 1600 West Helena, Arkansas, surrendered its license.
On February 26, 2002, the FCC accepted the sale of WKBJ to WMQM, Inc.
The call sign was changed to WMQM on May 29, 2002. (The "WMQM" call letters were previously assigned to AM 1480 in Memphis.)
On December 21, 2002, WMQM signed on with 50,000 watts at the new location in Memphis.

External links
WMQM official website

MQM
MQM
Radio stations established in 1955
1955 establishments in Tennessee